The Third Nail is a drama crime film directed by Kevin Lewis and starring Huntley Ritter, Krista Allen, Charles S. Dutton and Chloë Grace Moretz. It was released on February 8, 2008.

Plot 
A young man is erroneously sentenced to life in prison for killing two children. He is released after DNA evidence proves his innocence. After his release, a vengeful prison gang abducts and claims to murder his daughter.

Cast 
 Huntley Ritter as Trey Deonte
 Krista Allen as Hannah
 Charles S. Dutton as Sydney Washington
 Chloë Grace Moretz as Hailey Deonte
 Jake Muxworthy as Cory Hall
 Lisette Bross as Special Agent Jamison
 Kirsty Hinchcliffe as Kristie Deonte
 Robin Raven as Dana

References

External links 
 
 

2008 films
American crime drama films
2008 crime drama films
2000s English-language films
2000s American films